Teius teyou, the four-toed tegu, is one of the most common South American lizards. It  belongs to the genus  Teius and the family Teiidae.

It is found from southern Brazil to Argentina. It lives on open land and often takes cover in rocky areas. It  makes a tunnel for itself under soil and rocks to hide from enemies. It feeds on insects and spiders.

References

Further reading
 Longman Illustrated Animal Encyclopedia (1988)

Teius
Taxa named by François Marie Daudin
Reptiles described in 1802